Romania competed at the 1994 Winter Olympics in Lillehammer, Norway.

Competitors
The following is the list of number of competitors in the Games.

Alpine skiing

Women

Women's combined

Biathlon

Men

Women

Women's 4 × 7.5 km relay

 1 A penalty loop of 150 metres had to be skied per missed target.
 2 One minute added per missed target.

Bobsleigh

Cross-country skiing

Men

 1 Starting delay based on 10 km results. 
 C = Classical style, F = Freestyle

Figure skating

Men

Luge

(Men's) Doubles

Women

Speed skating

Men

Women

References
Official Olympic Reports 
 Olympic Winter Games 1994, full results by sports-reference.com

Nations at the 1994 Winter Olympics
1994
Winter Olympics